The 1997 Western Michigan Broncos football team was an American football team that represented Western Michigan University during the 1997 NCAA Division I-A football season. In their first season under head coach Gary Darnell, the Broncos compiled an 8–3 record and finished in second place in the West Division of the Mid-American Conference (MAC). In non-conference games, they defeated Temple (34–14) and Louisiana–Monroe (32–19) and lost to Michigan State (42–10).

The team's statistical leaders were Tim Lester with 2,160 passing yards, Robert Sanford with 1,033 rushing yards, and Corey Alston with 32 catches for 761 receiving yards. Sanford was named the MAC freshman of the year.

Gary Darnell was hired as Western's head football coach on December 14, 1996. He had been an assistant coach at Texas since 1992, including three years as defensive coordinator.

Schedule

References

Western Michigan
Western Michigan Broncos football seasons
Western Michigan Broncos football